Charles Merrin Hill (18 July 1903 in Dublin, Ireland – 7 July 1982 in Dublin) was an Irish cricketer. A right-handed batsman, he played just once for the Ireland cricket team, a first-class match against Scotland in July 1927.

References

1903 births
1982 deaths
Irish cricketers
Cricketers from County Dublin